Piñera is one of eight parishes (administrative divisions) in Navia, a municipality within the province and autonomous community of Asturias, in northern Spain.

Villages
 Busmargalí (Busmargalín)
 El Seijo (El Seixo) 
 Freal 
 Frejulfe (Frexulfe) 
 Fuentes (Fontes) 
 Piñera 
 Somorto (El Somourtu)
 Villaoril (Villauril)

Parishes in Navia